The following is a list of notable events and releases that happened in 1992 in music in South Korea.

Debuting and disbanded in 1992

Debuting

Groups
N.EX.T
Seo Taiji and Boys

Soloists
Kim Gun-mo
Kim Jong-seo
Kang San-eh
Shin Sung-woo
Uhm Jung-hwa
Lee Eun-mi

Releases in 1992

January

February

March

April

May

June

July

August

September

October

November

December

References

South Korean music
K-pop